Delta Alpha Pi is an American Honor Society founded in 2004 to recognize high-achieving college and university students with disabilities. Membership is open to both undergraduate and graduate students at colleges and universities with chartered chapters of DAPi and who meet certain criteria:

History
Delta Alpha Pi was founded in 2004 at East Stroudsburg University of Pennsylvania. It became national in 2006 and became a not-for-profit 501(c)(3) organization in 2008 as "Delta Alpha Pi International Honor Society"

 Delta Alpha Pi has over 150 chapters.

Symbols
The three Greek letters have specific meaning.

Delta – D for Disability
Alpha – A stands for Achievement
Pi – P represents Pride

References

External links

Honor societies
2004 establishments in Pennsylvania
Student organizations established in 2004
Disability organizations